Frederick Piper (23 September 1902 – 22 September 1979) was an English actor of stage and screen who appeared in over 80 films and many television productions in a career spanning over 40 years. Piper studied drama under Elsie Fogerty at the Central School of Speech and Drama, then based at the Royal Albert Hall, London.

Never a leading player, Piper was usually cast in minor, sometimes uncredited, parts although he also appeared in some more substantial supporting roles. Piper never aspired to star-status, but became a recognisable face on the British screen through the sheer volume of films in which he appeared. His credits include a number of films which are considered classics of British cinema, among them five 1930s Alfred Hitchcock films; he also appeared in many Ealing Studios productions, including some of the celebrated Ealing comedies.

Stage career

Born in London, England in September 1902, Piper worked as a tea merchant before starting his acting career on the stage in the 1920s, playing in London productions and also touring as far afield as Canada. He continued to appear in theatrical productions in the West End alongside his screen roles. These included appearances in the original runs of Barré Lyndon's The Man in Half Moon Street, Vernon Sylvaine's Nap Hand, N.C. Hunter's A Day by the Sea, Robert Bolt's Flowering Cherry and Home at Seven and The White Carnation by R.C. Sheriff.

Film career

His first film appearance came in the 1933 production The Good Companions.

An unassuming man with no trappings of ambition or conceit, Piper rapidly earned a reputation as a reliable, congenial presence on set and became a first choice for directors with smaller roles to cast, accumulating screen credits at the rate of up to six a year through to the 1960s. He appeared as an extra in Hitchcock's 1934 film The Man Who Knew Too Much (credited as "Policeman with Rifle"), and the following year was cast again by Hitchcock in the role of the milkman in the famous scene with Robert Donat in The 39 Steps. Piper was only on screen for seconds, but the iconic nature of the scene ultimately made this probably his most famous film appearance.

Later minor roles for Hitchcock were Sabotage (1936 – as the doomed bus conductor), Young and Innocent (1937) and Jamaica Inn (1939 – as Charles Laughton's agent).

Piper's services were always in demand, and he is said to have once joked that he had cornered the market in unnamed police officers and barmen. From the late 1930s he became associated with Ealing Studios, appearing in dozens of their productions, from cheaply shot programmers through to the company's most prestigious films such as In Which We Serve (1942). Most of Piper's roles were fleeting and his name rarely appeared in promotional material, but there was an occasional more substantial part in films such as Nine Men (1943), The October Man (1947) and Hunted (1952). Other films include Hue and Cry, Passport to Pimlico (1949) and The Lavender Hill Mob (1951).

From the early 1960s film work began to dry up, but Piper continued to find work in television, a medium on which he had first appeared as early as 1938 in a production of J. B. Priestley's play Laburnum Grove for the fledgling BBC. His TV credits during the 1960s included popular series such as Danger Man, Dixon of Dock Green and cult favourite The Prisoner. Piper's last credit however was in a film, a minor role in the 1971 production Burke & Hare.

Piper died in London on 22 September 1979, one day short of his 77th birthday.

Filmography

1933: The Good Companions - Ted Ogelthorpe
1934: Red Ensign - Mr. McWilliams (uncredited)
1934: The Man Who Knew Too Much - Policeman with Rifle (uncredited)
1935: The 39 Steps - The Milkman (uncredited)
1935: The Guv'nor - Gendarme (uncredited)
1936: Fame - Press Representative
1936: Everything Is Thunder - Policeman Denker
1936: Crown v. Stevens - Arthur Stevens
1936: Where There's a Will - Joe, Detective Taking Fingerprints (uncredited)
1936: Sabotage - Bus Conductor (uncredited)
1936: Jack of All Trades - Jimmy (Employment Clerk) (uncredited)
1937: Feather Your Nest - Mr. Green - The Recording Engineer (uncredited)
1937: Farewell Again - Minor Role (uncredited)
1937: Non-Stop New York - Barman (uncredited)
1937: Oh, Mr Porter! - Mr. Leadbetter - Railway Official (uncredited)
1937: Young and Innocent - Minor Role (uncredited)
1938: Climbing High - Official in Asylum Car (uncredited)
1938: They Drive by Night - Bartender (uncredited)
1939: Jamaica Inn - Davis - Sir Humphrey's Agent
1939: The Four Just Men - Pickpocket (uncredited)
1941: East of Piccadilly - Ginger Harris
1941: 49th Parallel - David
1942: The Big Blockade - Malta official (uncredited)
1942: In Which We Serve - Edgecombe
1943: Nine Men - Banger Hill
1943: The Bells Go Down - Police Sergeant (uncredited)
1943: San Demetrio London - Boatswain W.E. Fletcher
1944: It Happened One Sunday - (uncredited)
1944: Champagne Charlie - Learoyd
1944: Fiddlers Three - Auctioneer
1944: The Return of the Vikings - Sgt. Fred Johnson
1945: Johnny Frenchman - Zacky Penrose
1945: Pink String and Sealing Wax - Dr. Pepper
1947: Hue and Cry - Mr. Kirby
1947: The Loves of Joanna Godden - Isaac Turk
1947: The October Man - Det. Insp. Godby
1947: Master of Bankdam - Ben Pickersgill
1947: It Always Rains on Sunday - Det. Sergt. Leech
1948: Escape - Brownie - convict
1948: Penny and the Pownall Case - Policeman
1948: My Brother's Keeper - Camp Caretaker
1948: To the Public Danger (Short) - Labourer
1948: Fly Away Peter - Mr. Hapgood
1948: Look Before You Love - Miller
1949: The History of Mr. Polly - Mr. Wintershed (uncredited)
1949: Vote for Huggett - Mr. Bentley
1949: Passport to Pimlico - Garland
1949: It's Not Cricket - Yokel
1949: Don't Ever Leave Me - Max Marshall
1950: The Blue Lamp - Alf Lewis
1951: The Lavender Hill Mob - Cafe Owner (uncredited)
1952: Hunted - Mr. Sykes
1952: Home at Seven - Mr. Petherbridge
1952: Brandy for the Parson - Customs Inspector
1952: Escape Route - Inspector Reid
1953: Cosh Boy - Mr. Easter (uncredited)
1953: Deadly Nightshade - Mr. Pritchard
1954: Devil on Horseback - Miner
1954: Conflict of Wings - Joe Bates
1954: The Rainbow Jacket - Lukey
1954: Lease of Life - The Jeweller
1955: Doctor at Sea - Sandyman
1955: Value for Money - Broadbent Snr. in photograph (uncredited)
1956: The Man in the Road - Medwood Inspector Hayman
1957: The Passionate Stranger - Mr. Poldy
1957: Suspended Alibi - Mr. Beamster
1957: Doctor at Large - Ernest (uncredited)
1957: Second Fiddle - Potter
1957: The Birthday Present - Careers Officer
1957: Barnacle Bill - Barman
1958: Dunkirk - Small Boat Owner (uncredited)
1959: Violent Moment - Jenkins
1960: A Touch of Larceny - Hall Porter (uncredited)
1960: Evidence in Concrete - Hall Porter (uncredited)
1960: The Day They Robbed the Bank of England - Policeman (uncredited)
1960: Dead Lucky - Harvey Walters
1961: Very Important Person - 2nd Scientist in Corridor
1961: The Monster of Highgate Ponds - Sam
1961: The Frightened City - Ogle
1961: What a Carve Up! - Hearse Driver
1961: Return of a Stranger - Fred
1962: Only Two Can Play - Mr. Davies
1962: Reach for Glory - Policeman
1962: The Piper's Tune - Gonzales
1963: Ricochet - Siddall
1964: Becket - Monk (uncredited)
1965: One Way Pendulum - Usher / Office Clerk
1965: Catacombs - Police Inspector Merkot
1965: He Who Rides a Tiger - Mr. Steed
1971: Burke & Hare - Lodger (final film role)

References

External links

Frederick Piper page at Alfred Hitchcock Wiki

1902 births
1979 deaths
English male film actors
English male television actors
Male actors from London
20th-century English male actors